Little Pucketa Creek is a tributary of Pucketa Creek and a sub-tributary of the Allegheny River located in both Allegheny and Westmoreland counties in the U.S. state of Pennsylvania.

Course

See also
 List of rivers of Pennsylvania
 List of tributaries of the Allegheny River

References

External links

U.S. Geological Survey: PA stream gaging stations

Rivers of Pennsylvania
Tributaries of the Allegheny River
Rivers of Allegheny County, Pennsylvania
Rivers of Westmoreland County, Pennsylvania